Tomopleura thola is a species of sea snail, a marine gastropod mollusk in the family Borsoniidae.

Description

Distribution
This marine species is endemic to Australia and occurs off New South Wales.

References

 Laseron, Charles F. Revision of the New South Wales Turridae (Mollusca): With 12 Plates Containing 264 Drawings by the Author. Australian Zoological Handbook. Sydney : Royal Zoological Society of New South Wales 1–56, pls 1–12

External links
 

thola
Gastropods of Australia
Gastropods described in 1954